Telmatherina antoniae is a species of fish in the subfamily Telmatherininae part of the family Melanotaeniidae, the rainbowfishes. It is endemic to Indonesia where it occurs only in Lake Matano on Sulawesi. The species was described in 1991 by Maurice Kottelat and its specific name honours his wife, Antonia.

Sources

antoniae
Taxa named by Maurice Kottelat
Taxonomy articles created by Polbot
Fish described in 1991